Pseudicius mirus is a jumping spider that lives on the Socotra Archipelago off the coast of the Yemen. The male was first described in 2002 by Wanda Wesołowska & Antonius van Harten.

References

Salticidae
Spiders described in 2002
Spiders of Asia
Fauna of Socotra